Vincenzo Mori (born 25 December 1946) is an Italian gymnast. He competed in eight events at the 1968 Summer Olympics.

References

External links
 

1946 births
Living people
Italian male artistic gymnasts
Olympic gymnasts of Italy
Gymnasts at the 1968 Summer Olympics
Sportspeople from Taranto